The Van Osdel House is a historic house in Mission Hill, South Dakota. It was built in 1912 for Abraham Lincoln Van Osdel, who served in the Union Army during the American Civil War of 1861-1865 and was later elected as a member of the South Dakota Legislature in 1877, 1881, 1885, 1899, 1906 and 1907. Van Osdel was also the commander of the South Dakota department of the Grand Army of the Republic, a book collector, an author and a poet; he died in 1936. The house has been listed on the National Register of Historic Places since April 16, 1980.

References

National Register of Historic Places in Yankton County, South Dakota
Houses completed in 1912
1912 establishments in South Dakota